Ioannis Koniaris (1801–1872) was a Greek politician of the 19th century, who was twice elected as Mayor of Athens, serving from 29 August 1854 until 22 November 1853 and again until 23 November 1854.

Sources
 
 Ioannis Koniaris a synoptic biographical information from the Modern Greek Information Institute 
 City of Athens - Historic Mayors 

1801 births
1872 deaths
Mayors of Athens